Sudamerlycaste is a genus of flowering plants in the family Orchidaceae. It consists of approximately 45 species. The genus was split off from Lycaste in 2002 by Fredy Archila.

Taxonomy
Species in Lycaste that were endemic to South America and the Caribbean Islands were placed into the new genus Sudamerlycaste and those found in Mexico and Central America stayed in Lycaste. As a result of this change most of the species previously found in the Lycaste section Fimbriatae were then moved to the genus Sudamerlycaste. Species are either epiphytes or terrestrial. In 2003 Henry Oakeley and Angela Ryan published the genus name Ida to accommodate South American and Caribbean plants previously placed in Lycaste. Their description included the type species of Sudamerlycaste, Lycaste andreettae. This renders Ida an illegitimate name.

Species
Accepted species as of July 2016 according to The Plant List:

Sudamerlycaste acaroi 
Sudamerlycaste andreettae 
Sudamerlycaste angustitepala 
Sudamerlycaste ariasii 
Sudamerlycaste barringtoniae 
Sudamerlycaste barrowiorum 
Sudamerlycaste castanea 
Sudamerlycaste ciliata 
Sudamerlycaste cinnabarina 
Sudamerlycaste cobbiana 
Sudamerlycaste costata 
Sudamerlycaste diastasia 
Sudamerlycaste dunstervillei 
Sudamerlycaste dyeriana 
Sudamerlycaste ejirii 
Sudamerlycaste fimbriata 
Sudamerlycaste fragans 
Sudamerlycaste fulvescens 
Sudamerlycaste gigantea 
Sudamerlycaste grandis 
Sudamerlycaste heynderycxii 
Sudamerlycaste hirtzii 
Sudamerlycaste jamesiorum 
Sudamerlycaste jimenezii 
Sudamerlycaste lacheliniae 
Sudamerlycaste laciniata 
Sudamerlycaste lanipes 
Sudamerlycaste lata 
Sudamerlycaste linguella 
Sudamerlycaste lionetii 
Sudamerlycaste locusta 
Sudamerlycaste maxibractea 
Sudamerlycaste × monopampanensis 
Sudamerlycaste munaensis 
Sudamerlycaste nana 
Sudamerlycaste pegueroi 
Sudamerlycaste peruviana 
Sudamerlycaste priscilae 
Sudamerlycaste reichenbachii 
Sudamerlycaste rikii 
Sudamerlycaste rossyi 
Sudamerlycaste shigerui 
Sudamerlycaste × tornemezae 
Sudamerlycaste × troyanoi 
Sudamerlycaste uribei

References

Ryan, A. and Oakeley, H. (2003) Ida A. Ryan and Oakeley, a new genus, based on Lycaste section Fimbriatae Fowlie (Orchidaceae, tribe Cymbideae, subtribe Lycastinae). Orchid Dig. 67. (1): 8-10.

Maxillariinae genera
Maxillariinae